Hud (also Romanized as Hūd) is a village in Ludab Rural District, Ludab District, Boyer-Ahmad County, Kohgiluyeh and Boyer-Ahmad Province, Iran. At the 2006 census, its population was 82, in 15 families.

References 

Populated places in Boyer-Ahmad County